

This is a list of the National Register of Historic Places listings in Creek County, Oklahoma.

This is intended to be a complete list of the properties and districts on the National Register of Historic Places in Creek County, Oklahoma, United States. The locations of National Register properties and districts for which the latitude and longitude coordinates are included below, may be seen in a map.

There are 30 properties and districts listed on the National Register in the county.

Current listings

|}

See also

 List of National Historic Landmarks in Oklahoma
 National Register of Historic Places listings in Oklahoma

References

 
Creek County